PayDay (stylized as "PAYDAY") is a brand of a candy bar first introduced in 1932 by the Hollywood Candy Company. The original PayDay candy bar consists of salted peanuts rolled over a nougat-like sweet caramel center. Since 1996, classic PayDay candy bars without chocolate have been continually produced by The Hershey Company. In 2020, Hershey's released a "Chocolatey PayDay bar" as a permanent part of the PayDay product line; it is identical to the regular bar, but covered by a layer of chocolate.

History
PayDay was first introduced in 1932 by Hollywood Candy Company and got its name because it was first produced on pay day at the company. PAYDAY was marketed during the Great Depression as a meal replacement because of its dense peanut outer layer. Headed by Frank Martoccio, who had founded the F.A. Martoccio Macaroni Company, Hollywood also produced the ZERO bar, originally called the Double Zero when first released in 1920. In 1938, Hollywood moved to Centralia, Illinois. In 1967, the Martoccio family sold Hollywood Brands to Consolidated Foods, which later became Sara Lee. Fire destroyed the Centralia plant in 1980. Production of the PayDay bar continued with help from the L.S. Heath and Sons Company until a new facility could be constructed. In 1988, Hollywood Brands was acquired by the Leaf Candy Company and then later became part of The Hershey Company in 1996 via its acquisition of Leaf North America.

PayDay was named the #3 candy bar in the 2019 LA Times Candy Bar Power Rankings.

Etymology
PayDay got its name when none of the employees could think of a name. Someone thought of PayDay since they were getting paid that day. The name seemed perfect, and the candy bar was launched on pay day at its company of origin, the Hollywood Candy Company.

Product history
Peanut-dense PayDay bars were introduced in 1932 when candy bars were often viewed as meal replacements. Variations of the classic PayDay have included a glazed honey limited edition in 2003 and the PayDay Pro, a high protein energy bar, in 2005. For a promotion in 1989, PayDay candy bars each contained an individually wrapped nickel.

PAYDAY has a long history of offering chocolate-covered bars in its product line. In the 1980s, when owned by Sara Lee, there was a chocolate-covered PayDay. The Hershey Company has produced a limited version of chocolate PayDay in 2006 and the PayDay Chocolatey Avalanche in 2007, which was later discontinued. In August 2020, Hershey's released the Chocolatey PayDay candy bar as a permanent part of the product line.

Products currently available

PayDay
The original PayDay candy bar has been available since 1932. PayDay contains peanuts and caramel. There is also a Kingsize bar found in most stores (96g).

Nutrition

Ingredients
Peanuts, sugar, corn syrup, skim milk, vegetable oil, palm oil, sunflower oil
Contains 2% or Less of: Salt, carrageenan, mono- and diglycerides

Allergens
PayDay contains milk and peanuts.

Features and certifications
 Country of manufacture: USA
 Gluten free 
 OU-D

Chocolatey PayDay
The Chocolatey PayDay was added to the permanent brand portfolio in August 2020. Chocolatey PayDays contain salted peanuts and caramel and is coated in chocolate candy (not milk chocolate). The chocolatey candy bar is available in two sizes:
 1.84 ounce standard bar at suggested retail value of $1.11
 3.1 ounce king size bar at suggested retail value of $1.66

Nutrition

Ingredients
Sugar, peanuts, vegetable oil, palm oil, shea oil, sunflower oil, palm kernel oil, safflower oil, corn syrup, chocolate, skim milk. 
Contains 2% or less of: whey, salt, lecithin, carrageenan, mono- and diglycerides, vanillin (artificial flavor).

Allergens
Chocolatey PayDay contains milk, peanuts and soy.

Features and certifications
 Country of manufacture: USA
 OU-D

References

External links

 

Candy bars
Products introduced in 1932
The Hershey Company brands
Kosher food
Brand name confectionery